Wayne John Stephen Seabrook (born 6 September 1961) is an Australian cricketer. He played four first-class matches for New South Wales between 1984/85 and 1985/86.

A strong season for St George at club level in 1984–85 saw Seabrook selected in the NSW squad. He scored 165 on debut against Victoria that in January 1985, and was selected in the team the following summer, but was unable to rediscover the same form and lost his spot to Mark Taylor. He continued to play for the NSW Second XI for many years.

References

External links
 

1961 births
Living people
Australian cricketers
New South Wales cricketers
Cricketers from Sydney